The Nupchu Glacier is located in the eastern Himalayas in Nepal. It is north of Kanchenjunga.

References

Glaciers of Nepal